Forgy is an unincorporated community in Clark County, in the U.S. state of Ohio.

History
A post office was established at Forgy in 1883, and remained in operation until 1923. The community has the name of C. S. Forgy, a railroad official.

References

Unincorporated communities in Clark County, Ohio
1883 establishments in Ohio
Populated places established in 1883
Unincorporated communities in Ohio